Execution Guaranteed is the third full-length album released by the heavy metal band Rage in 1987. The album was remastered by Noise/Sanctuary in 2002 with slightly altered cover art, and six bonus tracks. Rudy Graf had been a member of the German heavy metal band Warlock until 1985.

Track listing

Personnel
Rage
Peter "Peavy" Wagner – vocals, bass
Jochen Schroeder – guitars
Rudy Graf – guitars
Jörg Michael – drums

Production
Rage – producer
Andi Musolf – engineer, mixing at Hartmann Digital Studios 
DEF – mixing, samples
Tommy Hansen – remixing at Horus Sound Studio

References

1987 albums
Rage (German band) albums
Noise Records albums